The 1980 Grote Prijs Jef Scherens was the 16th edition of the Grote Prijs Jef Scherens cycle race and was held on 21 September 1980. The race started and finished in Leuven. The race was won by Ludo Delcroix.

General classification

References

1980
1980 in road cycling
1980 in Belgian sport
September 1980 sports events in Europe